Bardeh Sepian (also Romanized as Bardeh Sepīān; also known as Bardaspīān) is a village in Baryaji Rural District, in the Central District of Sardasht County, West Azerbaijan Province, Iran. According to the 2006 census, its population was 45 people from 11 families.

References 

Populated places in Sardasht County